The TV8-301 was a small black and white television made by Sony. It is notable for being the world's first non-projection type all-transistor television. It had an eight-inch screen. It was also portable, having a bay in the back for two 6 volt lead acid batteries. It was priced high as it was innovative in many ways, so, to the average consumer it was something of a luxury item and not a practical buy. Additionally, this television was rather prone to malfunction, which led to it being called Sony's “frail little baby". Released on the market in 1960, it was discontinued in 1962.

Technical data
Transistors: 23 (silicon and germanium)
Diodes: 15 + 2 high-voltage (17)

References

External links
 TV8-301
 Image of B&W TV

Television technology
Sony products
History of television
Vacuum tube displays
Television sets